The Australian rugby league wooden spooners are the team that finished last in the premier top-grade rugby league competition in Australia, which is currently the National Rugby League, and was previously the New South Wales Rugby Football League (1908-1994), the Australian Rugby League (1995-1997), and Super League (1997). Each of these seasons is considered to represent one continuous line of competition dating back from the first season in 1908. The wooden spoon is an unofficial award, however, fans often bring "real" wooden spoons to taunt opposition sides who are struggling on the bottom of the ladder.

Since the Melbourne Storm's salary cap breach which saw them win the wooden spoon in 2010 (more below), betting agencies have instead placed wagers on who would suffer the most losses in a single season, rather than win the wooden spoon itself.

First grade

NRL Women's Premiership 
Bold teams indicate that the club still exists in the present competition.

NRL Under-20s

NSW Cup

Queensland Cup
Bold teams indicate that the club still exists in the present competition.

Brisbane Rugby League premiership
Bold teams indicate that the club still exists in the present competition.

Ron Massey Cup

Reversing fortunes
Western Suburbs were the only team to finish last in a season (1933) and then back up with a premiership in the following year. In season 2009 the Sydney Roosters finished last, winning just five games, however conjured a remarkable turnaround on and off the field to make the Grand final the following season. 

In 2003, the Penrith Panthers won a premiership after finishing wooden spooners in 2001, and after finishing round 2 of the 2003 season in last place (15th). In the 2014 NRL season, the Cronulla-Sutherland Sharks were the wooden spoon recipients. They went on to win the 2016 Premiership.

After winning the 1942 premiership, Canterbury-Bankstown then crashed to last place in season 1943.  After winning the 1952 premiership, Western Suburbs finished last in the season 1953. South Sydney went from minor premiers in 1989 to wooden spooners in 1990. 

In 2010 the Melbourne Storm repeated this feat, albeit in unusual circumstances. The Storm then went on to win its first official minor premiership in the 2011 season, before finishing one game short of the Grand Final.

Avoiding the spoon
As of 2022, the Manly-Warringah Sea Eagles have avoided the wooden spoon in their 75 completed seasons since entering the competition in 1947. They are the only current pre-1995 club to have avoided the wooden spoon.
Two other current clubs have also never claimed the wooden spoon: New Zealand Warriors (27), and St. George Illawarra (23).

The Balmain Tigers enjoyed a sixty-two season wooden spoon drought from 1911-1974, and St. George Dragons had gone 60 seasons (1939-1998) prior to the joint venture with the Illawarra Steelers

Spoon Bowl
In recent NRL seasons, the media had started to describe the matches between the two last placed sides as the "Spoon Bowl".  One of the first instances the term being used was in 2011 when the Parramatta Eels and the Gold Coast Titans played against each other in the final match of the regular season with the loser receiving the wooden spoon.  In 2014, the term was used again when Canberra played against Cronulla with both sides sitting on the bottom of the table.  In 2015, Newcastle and Penrith played against each other in the third instance of the "Spoon Bowl" term to be used.  In 2017, the Wests Tigers and Newcastle played in the fourth spoon bowl game with Wests defeating Newcastle and avoiding last place.  In 2018, Parramatta who were in last place and Canterbury who were in second last faced off against each other in the fifth edition of the spoon bowl.  There were fears before the match that it could have been the lowest crowd for an NRL game in 20 years.  Parramatta went on to win the game 14-8.  In Round 24 of the 2018 season, Parramatta played against North Queensland in the sixth edition of the spoon bowl.  North Queensland won the match 44-6 in Townsville which was also Johnathan Thurston's final home game before retirement, the match was also Matt Scott's 250th game.  The result ensured Parramatta finished with the wooden spoon, their 14th in total.

In round 24 of the 2022 NRL season, the Gold Coast who were second last on the table played against Newcastle who were third bottom in the Spoon Bowl match.  The Gold Coast needed a win to ensure their survival from the wooden spoon whilst Newcastle could have mathematically still received it.  The Gold Coast would win the match 36-26 ensuring the Wests Tigers would finish last for the first time in their 22-year history.

Notes
1  The club has since merged with another club to form a joint venture.
2  The Canterbury-Bankstown Bulldogs finished last after they received a 37 premiership points deduction for gross salary cap breaches. Despite their punishment, statistically South Sydney were the worst performing team of the 2002 season, finishing with 14 competition points and a win–loss ratio of 5/19 compared to the Bulldog's 20/4 result which, discarding their deduction, would have earned them 44 competition points.
3  The Melbourne Storm finished last on zero points after they received an 8 premiership points deduction and were barred from receiving further premiership points for the rest of the season due to long-term gross salary cap breaches. Despite their punishment, statistically the North Queensland Cowboys were the poorest performing team of the 2010 season, finishing with 14 competition points and a win–loss ratio of 5/19 compared to Melbourne's 14/10 result which, discarding their ban, would have earned them 32 competition points.
4  Whilst the first grade side won the 2011 premiership, their Toyota Cup counterparts endured a long season at the bottom of the ladder. The first grade side has never won the wooden spoon.

See also

References

External links

Wood
Australian rugby league lists
New South Wales Rugby League premiership